{{Infobox organization
| name                = Southern Transitional Council '
| logo                = شعار المجلس الانتقالي الجنوبي باللون الذهبي.svg
| logo_size           = 150px
| logo_alt            = 
| logo_caption        = Official seal
| image               = 
| image_size          = 
| alt                 = 
| caption             = 
| abbreviation        = STC
| formation           = Aden Historic DeclarationDraft committee formed: Delegated: Inaugurated:  

| founder             = Major General Aidarus al-Zoubaidi
| type                = Secessionist organization
Transitional government authority
| purpose             = Restoration of sovereignty of South Yemen
| headquarters        = Tawahi District. Aden, Yemen
| origins             = The Southern Movement
| region              = Historic south Arabia/South Yemen
| sec_gen             = Governor of Aden/  Ahmed Hamid Lamlas
| leader_title        = Board Chairman, & President
| leader_name         = Major General Aidarus al-Zoubaidi
| leader_title2       = Board Vice-Chairman, & Vice-president
| leader_name2        = Hani Ben Brik
| leader_title3       = Chairman of the National Assembly
| leader_name3        = General Ahmed Said Ben Brik
| main_organ          = Council’s Presidency Board
| website             = stcaden.com
}}
The Southern Transitional Council (STC;  al-Majlis al-Intiqālī l-Janūbiyy) is a secessionist organization in South Yemen. The 26 members of the STC include the governors of five southern governorates and two government ministers. It was formed by a faction of the Southern Movement, also known as al-Hirak al-Janoubi''. The Southern Movement was established in 2007, during the term of former president Ali Abdullah Saleh, and it has called for and worked toward the separation of southern Yemen from the rest of the nation (as it previously was until 1990).

Declared on 11 May 2017, the council is headed by the former Governor of Aden, Aidarus al-Zoubaidi, as president, with former minister of state Hani Bin Breik as vice-president. The formation of the council was authorized a week earlier by the Historic Aden Declaration, announced at a rally protesting the dismissal of al-Zoubaidi from his post as governor. The STC, a major party to the Yemeni Civil War, claims to rule most of the territory in southern Yemen.

History
On 27 April 2017, a presidential decree was given by Abdrabbuh Mansur Hadi dismissing Aidarus al-Zoubaidi from his post as governor of Aden, due to his close ties with the UAE whom President Hadi described as "acting like occupiers" in the city. This was met with large demonstrations in the city in support of the deposed but popular Zoubaidi.

With the help and support of the UAE, the STC was formed on 11 May 2017 with Aidarus al-Zoubaidi as its leader. Immediately, President Hadi called the council illegitimate.

Beginning on 28 January 2018, separatists loyal to the STC seized control of the Yemeni government headquarters in Aden in a coup d'état against the Hadi government.

In January 2018, as the head of the STC, Aidarus al-Zoubaidi announced a state of emergency in Aden and that "the STC has begun the process of overthrowing Hadi’s rule over the South".

On 27 August 2019, tensions continued to escalate in southern Yemen after the UAE-backed Security Belt Forces (SBF) lost territories to troops loyal to the Saudi-backed government of President Hadi. The troops advanced on the capital Aden and instead of engaging in street fighting, took positions outside of the city in order to prevent civilian casualties.

On 29 August 2019, to stop government forces from advancing and reclaiming the capital, the UAE carried out airstrikes on government positions outside of Aden, which killed and injured over 300 government soldiers.

Despite membership in the coalition fighting the Iran-aligned Houthi rebels, the UAE fell out with Hadi's government after the former accused Hadi of aligning with the Islah party, a powerful party, which it viewed as ideologically close to the Muslim Brotherhood.

The STC declared self-governance on 26 April 2020. The government said local and security authorities in the provinces of Hadramawt, Abyan, Shabwa, al-Mahra, and the island of Socotra dismissed the move as a "clear and definite coup". In Aden, the movement's attempt was successful, as it occupied all governmental institutions.

In order to deal with the infighting between the Yemeni government forces and those of the secessionist Southern Transitional Council, a new cabinet was formed with the backing of neighbouring Saudi Arabia. The formation of the new unity government in December 2020, which includes equal numbers of representatives from each region of Yemen's northern and southern areas, was the result of over a year's worth of intense negotiations mediated by the Saudis, and was meant to end the infighting so that the two sides could fight together against the Houthi rebels in the ongoing civil war.

Aden Historic Declaration

The speech which was prepared by a committee headed by him contained a direct delegation for him to declare political national leadership under his presidency to administrate and represent the South and take all necessary measures to achieve the southern people's obviatives and aspirations fully empowered by the will of the people who gathered in a historic demonstration. The declaration reasserted the deep strong partnership between Southern people and Arab Coalition States led by Saudi Arabia and the United Arab Emirates in achieving and fulfilling the mutual goals of averting Iranian expansion, fighting terrorism, and guaranteeing the security and stability in the region, while maintaining the people's ultimate goal to restore their sovereignty as a decisive element of the region’s security. This document, which was named by its first article the Aden Historic declaration, is considered along with the significantly large masses who were present as a legal authorization from the people of the south to the later formed political body, the Southern transitional council, and for that, all announcements and orders issued by the STC begins with the statement "After reviewing the (Aden Historic Declaration) issued in the capital, Aden, on May 4, 2017".

STC Backing 
The UAE helped create the SBF in southern Yemen. Since its formation, the SBF has played a crucial role in the Saudi-led coalition before the recent escalation.

Its successes came in part due to being militarily backed by the UAE. The backing included training of SBF fighters in Abu Dhabi and the supply of military equipment. Emirati backing was crucial in helping the STC gain Aden, which has been under its control since 2018.

See also
Southern Movement
Yemeni Socialist Party
South Yemen insurgency

References

Arab separatism
Politics of Yemen
Yemeni Crisis (2011–present)
2017 establishments in Yemen
Secessionist organizations
Separatism in Yemen